Cuatro Islas (Spanish, meaning "Four Islands") is a group of islands belonging to the municipalities of Inopacan and Hindang, in the province of Leyte, Philippines. This group of islands is composed of Apid, Digyo and Mahaba, which belong to the administrative jurisdiction of the municipality of Inopacan, while Himokilan belongs to the administrative jurisdiction of the municipality of Hindang.

Tourism
The islands are drawing a good number of local and foreign tourists to their pristine beaches and coral reefs. While the islands are protected by the combination of overfishing, and poorly enforced fishing regulations, unmanaged solid waste (especially plastics) have put the islands and their associated marine ecosystems under pressure.  With improved protection (especially expansion of the sanctuary areas) and infrastructure, the islands ecosystems health can recover.

The islands hold great potential to become a recreational diving destination, as the marine ecosystems' health improves and proper infrastructure is established.

See also
List of protected areas of the Philippines

References
 http://www.wowphilippines.com.ph/explore_phil/place_details.asp?content=thingstodo&province=44

Protected landscapes and seascapes of the Philippines
Islands of Leyte (province)
Beaches of the Philippines